Judge Pendleton may refer to:

Edmund Pendleton (1721–1803), Virginia state court judge serving at various levels of the judiciary
Francis Key Pendleton (1850–1930), judge of the Supreme Court of New York (the state's trial court)
Nathaniel Pendleton (1756–1821), judge of the United States District Court for the District of Georgia
Philip C. Pendleton (1779–1863), judge of the United States District Court for the Western District of Virginia